24 Sussex Drive, originally called Gorffwysfa and usually referred to simply as 24 Sussex, is the official residence of the prime minister of Canada, located in the New Edinburgh neighbourhood of Ottawa, Ontario. Built between 1866 and 1868 by Joseph Merrill Currier, it has been the official home of the prime minister of Canada since 1951.  It is one of two official residences made available to the prime minister, the Harrington Lake estate in nearby Gatineau Park being the other.

History
The house at 24 Sussex Drive was originally commissioned in 1866 by lumberman and Member of Parliament Joseph Merrill Currier as a wedding gift for his wife-to-be Hannah Wright. It was completed in 1868 and Currier named it Gorffwysfa, Welsh for "place of rest". It was sold for $30,000 in 1901, after Hannah Currier's death, to William Edwards.

In 1943, the federal Crown-in-Council used its power of expropriation to divest Gordon Edwards, nephew of William Edwards, of his title to the house, to consolidate Crown ownership of the lands along the Ottawa River. Edwards had fought the action, but eventually lost the dispute with the Canadian government in 1946 and died at the house later that year.

After several years of uncertainty, the government decided in 1950 to refurbish the property as a residence for the prime minister, the renovations costing just over $500,000. Louis St. Laurent was the first to take up residence in 1951. Since then, every prime minister—except for Kim Campbell (who resided at Harrington Lake) and, to date, Justin Trudeau (who has opted to reside at Rideau Cottage pending a review of work needed to repair the house)—has resided at 24 Sussex Drive for the duration of their times in office. Previous prime ministers lived at a variety of locations around Ottawa: Wilfrid Laurier and William Lyon Mackenzie King, for instance, lived at Laurier House in Sandy Hill. Laurier House was willed to the Crown upon Mackenzie King's death in 1950 and was thus also available for designation as the prime minister's official residence at the time.

Security at 24 Sussex was overhauled following a November 1995 attempted assassination by André Dallaire, who wandered around the house and grounds for nearly an hour before being confronted outside Jean Chrétien's bedroom by the prime minister's wife, Aline; she locked the door to the bedroom while Jean guarded it with an Inuit stone carving. Ultimately, Royal Canadian Mounted Police officers arrested Dallaire. Measures put in place after the attempted assassination include the addition of several more guards and security cameras to the house's attaché, and the installation of crash-proof barriers within the main gates.

Use

Unlike 10 Downing Street or the White House, 24 Sussex Drive has been used almost exclusively as a place of residence (and therefore its address has never been widely used as a metonym for the Office of the Prime Minister). The prime minister's work is carried out by the Office of the Prime Minister in the Office of the Prime Minister and Privy Council building, near Parliament Hill. However, prime ministers have conducted some work at 24 Sussex Drive over the years, and informal meetings between prime ministers and other government or foreign officials have taken place in the house (foreign heads of state on state visits are officially hosted by the monarch or Governor General of Canada at Rideau Hall).

Despite the building not having any bureaucratic function, it has been the location of protests, such as when farmers drove their tractors in a convoy past the front of the property in 2006 and when Greenpeace activists chained themselves to the front gates in March 2007.

Stephen Harper is the most recent prime minister to have resided at 24 Sussex Drive, leaving in 2015. 24 Sussex has remained unoccupied, but staff use its kitchen to prepare meals which are then delivered to Trudeau's family at Rideau Cottage.

Architecture
The house consists of 35 rooms spread on four floors, including the basement, connected by an elevator and many staircases. The basement consists of support rooms, while the main floor holds the dining room, living room, kitchen (which is staffed by a head chef and support staff), main stair hall, prime minister's library, and a sun room. The second floor is primarily bedrooms, including the master bedroom, as well as a family room (described by Margaret Trudeau as her "freedom room") and the office of prime minister's spouse. The third floor contains additional bedrooms and a private study for the prime minister.

The exterior of the house is a mid-century modern take on Norman Revival architecture. When originally built, it was very much of the Victorian (Queen Anne) style; it had high gables, extensive verandahs, and a liberal use of gingerbread trim. A turret was added by the Edwards family in 1907. After it was decided in 1950 the house would become the official residence of the prime minister, the turret, widow's walk, trim, main gable at the front, verandahs, and porte-cochère were removed and an extension added to the east. The interior was gutted, save for part of the dining room.

The National Capital Commission (NCC) maintains the house, its property, and a selection of historic furnishings from the Crown Collection for use in the public rooms of the mansion, ranging from musical instruments to chairs, tables, and paintings by famous Canadians. However, due to the lack of restraints on the prime minister of the day to do what he or she pleases with the home, several have left their own marks on the building. For example, the rear patio was enclosed and winterised while Lester B. Pearson was prime minister and inside, Pearson's wife, Maryon, created in the basement the Canadiana Room, where she collected Canadian antiques and craft-work. While Joe Clark and his family were resident at 24 Sussex, the interiors were redecorated, the dining room ceiling receiving gold leaf re-purposed from another project. Unnamed business associates of Pierre Trudeau installed a swimming pool for his frequent workouts. The pool, designed by government architect Stig Harvor, reportedly cost  due to an underground access increasing the expense.  This was raised in a "public fund" headed by Keith Davey, the donors to which were never made public. Brian Mulroney was the first prime minister to have the costs of renovations publicly revealed. The high tab for his and his wife's alterations to the building caused political controversy, especially as some of the costs were paid for from the PC Canada Fund, which raised money from individual donations to fund the Progressive Conservative Party.

Since the renovation of the house in 2001, very little has been spent on upkeep of 24 Sussex Drive, leaving parts of it worn and outdated, including the heating and cooling systems, wiring, and roofing.  On May 6, 2008, the Auditor General reported that the house was in poor condition and needed about $10 million in repairs and upgrades, which would require at least 12 to 15 months of "full access" to complete. In October 2015, Bryan Baeumler estimated $15 million might be necessary to properly renovate the residence. The NCC devised a plan for major renovations, asserting such a project would require approximately 18 months.  In 2021 the NCC released a new cost estimate of $36.6 million to bring the house to a state of good repair.

There have been occasional calls to demolish the entire structure and rebuild. Maureen McTeer, wife of former Prime Minister Joe Clark, said the building is "completely lacking" in architectural value and is not worth saving. The idea of removing part of the structure and replacing it with a modern section has also been proposed. The designation as a federal heritage building, though not legally binding, would probably protect it against such a measure.

See also

 The Farm
 Stornoway

References

External links

 National Capital Commission website – 24 Sussex Drive
 Prime Minister of Canada website – History of 24 Sussex
 Prime Minister of Canada website – Virtual tour of 24 Sussex
 Property Record for 24 Sussex in the Directory of Federal Real Property

Houses completed in 1866
1866 establishments in Canada
Federal government buildings in Ottawa
Official residences in Canada
Prime ministerial residences
Houses in Ottawa
Neo-Norman architecture in Canada
Sussex Drive